Makaraka is an outer suburb of Gisborne, in New Zealand's North Island, located in the west of the city. The suburb features Gisborne's horse-racing circuit, Makaraka Racecourse. It is part of the statistical area of Makaraka-Awapuni, which is covered at Awapuni.

Makaraka was settled by dairy farmers in the 19th century. A dairy factory was built in the settlement in 1899.

The Tarere Marae, located near Makaraka, is a tribal meeting place of Te Whānau a Iwi, a hapū of Te Aitanga ā Māhaki. It includes Te Aotipu meeting house.

Education

References

Suburbs of Gisborne, New Zealand